James Steven Wilson (born 26 February 1989) is a Welsh professional footballer who plays as a defender for Plymouth Argyle. He has also represented Wales at international level. Primarily a centre-back, he can also play at right-back.

Club career

Bristol City
Wilson began his career at Bristol City, graduating from the club's academy before going on to make his debut for the first-team in 2008. He scored on his debut for the club on 26 August 2008, in a 2–1 League Cup loss to Crewe Alexandra at Gresty Road. He was loaned out to Brentford for the first three months of the 2008–09 season, where he put in a number of impressive performances in a central defensive partnership with Reading loanee Alan Bennett. He made 16 appearances for the club during his loan spell. Despite returning to Ashton Gate by November, Wilson was able to claim a Football League Two winners medal.

He rejoined Brentford in an initial one-month loan deal on 20 August 2009, the loan deal later extended to 1 January 2010. Wilson was dismissed for a professional foul on Gareth Ainsworth during an away match against Wycombe Wanderers on 24 November and gives away a penalty, although  Wojciech Szczęsny saved the spot-kick, Brentford still lost 1–0 at the end. He made 14 appearances during his second loan spell at Griffin Park.

He saw his first team involvement at Bristol City increase during the 2011–12 season, making 23 appearances in all competitions.

On 13 September 2013, Wilson joined Cheltenham Town on an initial one-month loan, making his debut for the club on 14 September 2013 in a 2–2 draw with Oxford United. He made 4 appearances before returning from his loan spell at the club.

Oldham Athletic
On 31 January 2014, Wilson signed for Oldham Athletic until the end of the 2013–14 season with a view to extending deal. He scored his first goal for the club on 29 April 2014, in a 1–1 draw with Sheffield United. He made 16 appearances during his first season at Oldham.

The one-year option that the club had on Wilson's contract was exercised, extending his contract till the end of the 2014–15 season. He became a first-team regular during the 2014–15 season, making 46 appearances in all competitions, scoring once.

He continued to be a regular in the first-team at Boundary Park during the 2015–16 season. He made 47 appearances in all competitions over the course of the season.

Sheffield United
On 5 July 2016, Wilson signed for Sheffield United on a two-year contract, after rejecting a new deal with Oldham. He scored his first goal for the club in a 2–1 win over Oxford United at Bramall Lane on 27 August 2016. He made 10 appearances during the 2016–17 season, as Sheffield United won the League One title and promotion to the Championship.

On 17 July 2017, Wilson joined League One club Walsall on loan until the end of the season. He made 20 appearances during his time at the club, scoring once.

Lincoln City
On 12 January 2018, Wilson signed for Lincoln City on a two-and-a-half-year deal, after leaving Sheffield United by mutual consent. Wilson was cup-tied for Lincoln's win in the 2018 EFL Trophy Final. He made 10 appearances during his first season at Sincil Bank.

After suffering a broken ankle during a match against Cambridge United, Wilson found his first team opportunities limited during the 2018–19 season. He made 16 appearances as Lincoln won the League Two title. His contract was terminated by mutual consent at the end of the season.

Ipswich Town
On 2 August 2019, Wilson signed a short-term contract with Ipswich Town until 1 January 2020. The next day, he made his debut for the club in a 1–0 away win against Burton Albion. After making 8 appearances for the club and impressing, Wilson signed a 18-month extension in October 2019, keeping him at the club until 2021. He made 31 appearances during his first season at Ipswich.

Wilson featured regularly during the early part of the 2020–21 season, before picking up a knee injury in October. He returned to the first-team squad on 20 February, starting in a 0–0 draw with Oxford United. Wilson scored his first goal for Ipswich in a 2–1 away win over Accrington Stanley on 2 March 2021, and his second against his former club Lincoln the following week. Wilson's impressive performances when he was fit to play during the season earned him Ipswich's Player of the Year award for the 2020–21 season. Despite this, on 10 May 2021, Ipswich announced that Wilson would be released following the end of his contract after being informed by new manager Paul Cook that he was not in his plans for the following season.

Plymouth Argyle
On 20 May 2021, Wilson was announced to be joining Plymouth Argyle on a free transfer following his release from Ipswich.

International career
Wilson is a former Wales under-21 international, and captained Wales at under-19 level.

He received his first call-up to the senior Wales squad in October 2012. He made his senior international debut for his country on 15 October 2013, in 1–1 draw against Belgium.

Career statistics

Club

International

Honours
Brentford
Football League Two: 2008–09

Sheffield United
EFL League One: 2016–17

Lincoln City
EFL Trophy: 2017–18
EFL League Two: 2018–19

Individual
Ipswich Town Player of the Year: 2020–21

References

External links

1989 births
Living people
Footballers from Newport, Wales
Welsh footballers
Wales youth international footballers
Wales under-21 international footballers
Wales international footballers
Association football defenders
Bristol City F.C. players
Brentford F.C. players
Cheltenham Town F.C. players
Oldham Athletic A.F.C. players
Sheffield United F.C. players
Walsall F.C. players
Lincoln City F.C. players
Ipswich Town F.C. players
Plymouth Argyle F.C. players
English Football League players